Izki may refer to:

Izki, a town in Oman
Izki, Iran, a village in Iran
Izki (river), a river in Basque Country, Spain